Glory for Salvation is the thirteenth studio album by the Italian symphonic power metal band Rhapsody of Fire. It was released on 26 November 2021 via AFM Records.

The album is the second chapter of The Nephilim's Empire Saga. It is the first studio album to feature Paolo Marchesich on drums.

Background 
On April 6, 2020, Vocalist Giacomo Voli in an exclusive interview, had revealed that the band were working on the album. Voli said: 

The band later announced that the recording of the album had been completed on 24 September 2020, and were confirmed to be mixing the album with Sebastian "Seeb" Levermann in April 2021. The first single off of the album, "I'll Be Your Hero" was released on 4 June 2021 as an EP. The album's details and release date were later announced on 8 July 2021, along with the release of the second single and title song "Glory for Salvation". The third single, "Magic Signs" was released on 2 September 2021. The fourth single, "Terial the Hawk", was released on 15 October 2021. The fifth single, "Chains of Destiny" was released on 7 November 2021, along with a music video. The sixth single, "Un'ode per l'eroe" was released on 17 December 2021, along with a music video.

Composition

Influences, style and themes 
According to Staropoli, the song "Chains of Destiny" is "an epic, uplifting and intense song, characterized by catchy melodies, fast paced rhythm, great vocals and choirs".

Concept 
Following the events from The Eighth Mountain, Kreel, the fallen wizard, has sworn vengeance on his masters. He is the servant of Bezrael, son of Chezaquill, the father of all Nephilim. Bezrael resurrected Kreel from the Abyss of Pain to serve his will. ("Son of Vengeance") He remembers his previous life and laments the kingdom of ice he is now living. ("The Kingdom of Ice") Years previously, Kreel murdered Namecid, the holy man of the Diaphanous Cathedral. ("Glory for Salvation") Ever since, Terial, the hawk made of ice, has followed Kreel. ("Eternal Snow") Terial symbolizes hope and forgiveness for Kreel for his past transgressions as he seeks to find peace and serenity. ("Terial the Hawk")

He then meets the Maid of the Secret Sand, Vardagwen, and intends to murder her. But instead, he falls in love with her and tells her to stay hidden to escape the wrath of Bezrael. ("Maid of the Secret Sand") Upon learning this Bezrael again imprisons him in the Abyss of Pain and brands him as a traitor. Upon accepting his fate, he emplores the Guardians of the Sky to watch over the maid of the secret sand since he knows his master will not set him free. ("Abyss of Pain II")

Feeling overwhelming guilt at what he has done, Kreel once again asks Terial the Hawk for forgiveness as he learns Vardagwen was killed by his master. He then swears revenge for all he has seen. ("Infinitae Gloriae") Still struggling with guilt and the desire for forgiveness for his transgressions, he prays for the mystic rain to wipe away his tears. ("Magic Signs") Kreel vows to change his life and be the hero Vardagwen would have wanted him to be. ("I'll Be Your Hero") Finally, he decides to break the chains of his destiny and turn against his Lord Bezrael in the name of Vardagwen and the prophet Namecid, whom he murdered. ("Chains of Destiny")

Track listing

Personnel 
Credits for Glory for Salvation adapted from liner notes.

Rhapsody of Fire
 Alex Staropoli – keyboards, orchestrations, choir vocals, engineering, production
 Roberto De Micheli – guitars
 Alessandro Sala – bass
 Giacomo Voli – lead and choir vocals
 Paolo Marchesich – drums

Additional personnel
 Manuel Staropoli – baroque recorders, flute
 Giovanni Davoli – uilleann pipes, low whistle
 Davide Simonelli – violin
 Mateo Sivelli – cello
 Valerio Mauro – harp

Choir
 Alex Mari, Angelo Guidetti, Erika Beretti, Gabriele Gozzi, Giacomo Pieracci, Giovani Maria Palmia

Production
 Sebastian "Seeb" Levermann – mixing, mastering
 Alberto Bravin – engineering, choir vocals
 Marco Vattovani – engineering
 Alexandre Charleux – artwork
 Paul Thureau – additional artwork, layout
 Emanuele Aliprandi – photography

Charts

References 

2021 albums
AFM Records albums
Rhapsody of Fire albums